Stonebroom is a village in the district of North East Derbyshire in Derbyshire, England. It is in the civil parish of Shirland and Higham.

Stonebroom lies to the east of the A61 between Alfreton and Clay Cross. It has a primary, nursery, pre-school and two churches, one Church of England and one Methodist. Five households are listed for Stonebroom in the 1841 Census (Shirland Parish) with a sixth listed separately under Pasture House which is part of the village. A directory from 1846 does not mention Stonebroom but one from 1857 acknowledges it and only gives the names of four farmers resident there. A directory from 1895 describes it as "a considerable village – it is a typical colliery village, and has sprung into existence in recent years".

In the mid-19th century, houses were built for colliery workers and were called 'the blocks'. These were blocks of eight terraced houses with 160 dwellings. They were condemned before 1939 but still there in 1947 and described by the Derbyshire Times as "The Black Hole of Derbyshire". In 1950 they were demolished but the area of wasteland was known as The Blocks by the locals. From the 1970s new housing and industrial estates were built on the land. Meanwhile, a massive housing estate had already been established in the "upper" area of Stonebroom.

The village is linear and was formed from two hamlets; early maps show them as Upper Stone and Lower Stone. The school playing field was once the site of a quarry, and is still called Quarry Lane. It is probable that the name Stonebroom was derived from this quarry which provided stone; it is said that the field behind the quarry was full of broom, which gave one possible explanation for the unusual village name. Another report states that the Roman Stan Brom means quarry.

Notable people
 Andy Garner – former professional footballer with Derby County and Blackpool
 Bill Copson – former cricketer who played for Derbyshire County Cricket Club and the England cricket team
 Joe Humphries – former cricketer who played for Derbyshire County Cricket Club and the England cricket team

See also
Listed buildings in Shirland and Higham

References

External links

British Library Archive of the Stonebroom accent. Horace Brian, a retired miner, talks about coal mining. He mentions water and gas problems and methods of supporting the mineshafts and setting charges. Recorded in 1956
 http://sounds.bl.uk/Accents-and-dialects/Survey-of-English-dialects/021M-C0908X0051XX-0600V1

Villages in Derbyshire
Towns and villages of the Peak Districte
North East Derbyshire District